Aleks Lukanov (Bulgarian: Алекс Луканов; born 22 February 2002) is a Bulgarian footballer who plays as a midfielder for Ludogorets Razgrad II.

Career
Lukanov completed his league debut for Ludogorets Razgrad on 26 May 2021 in a match against CSKA 1948.

References

External links
 

2002 births
Living people
Bulgarian footballers
Bulgaria youth international footballers
PFC Ludogorets Razgrad II players
PFC Ludogorets Razgrad players
First Professional Football League (Bulgaria) players
Association football midfielders